Olavi Rinteenpää (24 September 1924 – 10 January 2022) was a  Finnish steeplechase runner who competed in the 1952 Summer Olympics and in the 1956 Summer Olympics. Rinteenpää died on 10 January 2022, at the age of 97.

References

External links
 

1924 births
2022 deaths
Athletes (track and field) at the 1952 Summer Olympics
Athletes (track and field) at the 1956 Summer Olympics
Finnish male steeplechase runners
Olympic athletes of Finland